The Communauté de communes du Canton de Bray-sur-Seine (after 2006: Communauté de communes de la Bassée) is a former federation of municipalities (communauté de communes) in the Seine-et-Marne département and in the Île-de-France région of France. It was created in October 1973. It was merged into the new Communauté de communes de la Bassée - Montois in January 2014.

Composition 
The Communauté de communes comprised the following communes:

Baby
Balloy
Bazoches-lès-Bray
Bray-sur-Seine
Chalmaison
Everly
Fontaine-Fourches
Gouaix
Gravon
Grisy-sur-Seine
Hermé
Jaulnes
Montigny-le-Guesdier
Mousseaux-lès-Bray
Mouy-sur-Seine
Noyen-sur-Seine
Les Ormes-sur-Voulzie
Passy-sur-Seine
Saint-Sauveur-lès-Bray
La Tombe
Villenauxe-la-Petite
Villiers-sur-Seine
Villuis

See also
Communes of the Seine-et-Marne department

References

Former commune communities of Seine-et-Marne